Peter Fjellstedt (17 September 1802 – 4 January 1881) was a Swedish Nyevangelist missionary and preacher who founded the Fjellstedt School and Evangeliska Fosterlands-Stiftelsen.

Biography

Upbringing 
Fjellstedt was born to carpenter Lars Larsson and Catharina Carlsdotter in Värmland, Sweden in 1802, the first child in a poor family of craftsmen. His surname was originally Larsson. At a young age, he went from farm to farm to beg. In 1812 there was a severe famine in the area and the family had to mix bark and bone meal in their bread.

For several winters, he contributed to the family's livelihood by teaching the children of the neighbouring village to read and write. In the summers, he had to herd the family's sheep in the Dalsland forests around the cottage. Fjellstedt writes in his autobiography: "Often I went up on some big rock and preached, as best I could, to my cows, sheep and lambs". At one of these places where he preached there was a large stone which later came to be known as the Fjellstedt Stone and where every year since 1965 a service is held in his memory.

Education 
After Fjellstedt was confirmed, he managed to get into Karlstad's school of learning, thanks to gifts from the more prosperous farms in the area. He walked the  distance there. He then studied in Karlstad for three and a half years, renting living space from a tavernkeeper and having to sleep on the lid of a wooden chest with his coat for a blanket. In the school's name register he was for the first time given the surname Fjellstedt, after his home village of Fjällane.

In 1823, Fjellstedt began studies at Lund University in Christian ministry. There he met Esaias Tegnér, who encouraged him, even stating: "I have seen, tested and approved Peter Fjellstedt." He later stayed in Småland for over a year and a half working for Lieutenant Colonel C. Kuylenstierna and Major C. J. von Mentzer as a private tutor, where he experienced a strong spiritual revival. Fjellstedt returned to Lund in 1825 to complete his studies, where he was taught by a follower of Pietistic priest Henric Schartau. He also became convinced of his calling to go out as a missionary, a conviction that was consolidated during a time as a teacher at the Moravian school in Gothenburg. The school's founder had a number of writings on missions work which Fjellstedt had access to.

Missions work 
Fjellstedt then undertook further missionary training with Basel Mission, after which he went to London in 1829. In London, Fjellstedt studied medicine and had planned to study Arabic, Amharic, and Tigrinya to go to Ethiopia, but he was unable to go there so instead he studied Persian and Coptic. He married Christina Beata Schweizerbarth in London in 1831. The next year, he was sent by the Church Mission Society to Palayamkottai in Tamil Nadu, India, for his first missionary assignment. After three years, he returned home due to poor health, with one of his children dying on the trip home. In Stuttgart, he met one of his old friends from Basel, German missionary Johann Ludwig Krapf. He went on a further assignment to Izmir, Turkey, in 1836, as well as Malta, but left the mission field again in 1840. He then returned to Basel, where he served as a teacher at the Mission Institute.

Return to Sweden 
After working for a time as a traveling preacher in Switzerland, Germany and France, Fjellstedt returned to Sweden in 1843, where he was involved in teaching, writing and training. This involved a preaching tour in which he preached for 100,000 people in most of the counties of southern and central Sweden, speaking engagingly about his mission work. One priest, P. Wagenius, after hearing Fjellstedt's preaching likely in 1857, described the scene:

In 1845, money was gathered to support Fjellstedt and his family through enabling him to preach, establishing the Lund Missionary Society, where he became director in 1846. The institute moved first to Stockholm in 1856 and later to Uppsala in 1859, where it was renamed in 1862 and became a school for future priests: the Fjellstedt School.

Fjellstedt was awarded an honorary doctorate of theology by the University of Halle in Germany in 1853. His wife and children primarily stayed in Germany as she did not like life in Sweden.

In 1855, he proposed the foundation of a new free church mission, the Evangeliska Fosterlands-Stiftelsen, which was founded the following year. The organization remained part of the Lutheran church but was influenced by, and had much in common with, the Baptists and other free churches. A number of free-church colporteurs, itinerant sellers of Christian literature, were involved early on; however, many left to form the Baptist Union of Sweden in 1857. Fjellstedt would later influence the organization to begin mission work among the Oromo people in the Horn of Africa.

Fjellstedt supported lay preacher Amelie von Braun's pioneering Sunday school work, which she began sometime between 1848 and 1856. He also visited philanthropist Emilie Petersen, known as the 'Herrestad Grandmother'. She was godmother to his son Joel.

From 1861 to 1863, he preached in Överum. He also led a church meeting in which it was discussed whether or not to stay in the state church. After that, he worked at the Gothenburg cathedral with Peter Wieselgren for nine years, then spent several years in Germany before returning to Uppsala in the last few years of his life after his wife's death in 1876. Towards the end of his life he was engaged in writing; his  was one of Baptist publisher Per Palmqvist's most significant publications.

Upon his friend Wieselgren's death in 1877, he buried him at Stampens Cemetery in Gothenburg.

He was the first president of the organization , founded in 1880, which supported missions work in Lappmarken and was supported by the Swedish royal family and the Church of Sweden.

Religious views 
Fjellstedt was part of the Nyevangelism movement and a key figure among the Mission Friends. He was critical of the state of Christianity in the country. Around 1850 he wrote to the missionary inspector Blumhardt in Basel, "The state of Christianity in Sweden is very deplorable, and the cause is an ignorance which surpasses all imagination, and that among all classes of people."

Fjellstedt placed an emphasis on Christian eschatology, holding a historic premillenial, non-dispensationalist view on the Second Coming of Jesus, which he preached on. His work  also addresses these topics, discussing the signs of the times and the date of the return of Christ as well as the Antichrist and the apostasy of the Jews.

In 1856–1861 he wrote a Bible version with commentaries between the original verses. It was published in nine editions until 1919.

Death 
He died in Uppsala in 1881 and is buried in Uppsala old cemetery.

Selected works 

  (3 volumes, 1849–1855)
  (1846–1861)
  (1848–1861)
  (1855)
  (1849), awarded a royal prize

References

Notes

Sources

Further reading 

 Snellman, Karin (ed.) Peter Fjellstedt: Reseberättelse från Lappland 1857

1802 births
1881 deaths
Swedish Protestant missionaries
Protestant missionaries in India
Lund University alumni
Swedish expatriates in India
Burials at Uppsala old cemetery
Pietists